Abid Anwar is a Bangladeshi poet, critic, and lyricist. For his contributions to Bengali poetry, he was awarded the Bangla Academy Literary Award in 2012.

References

Further reading
 
 

Living people
Bangladeshi male poets
Bangladeshi literary critics
Recipients of Bangla Academy Award
Year of birth missing (living people)
Place of birth missing (living people)